This is a list of professional and semi-professional theaters in Norway.

Agder Teater, Kristiansand
Beaivvas Sami Teater
BIT Teatergarasjen
Black Box Teater, Oslo
Brageteatret
Carte Blanche Danseteater
Den Nationale Scene in Bergen
Det Norske Teatret, Oslo
Grenland Friteater, Skien
Haugesund Teater, Haugesund
Hedmark Teater, Hamar
Hordaland Teater
Hålogaland Teater, Tromsø
Nationaltheateret (The National Theatre), Oslo
Nordland Teater
Oslo Nye Teater, Oslo
Riksteatret, based in Oslo, touring all over the country
Rogaland Teater, Stavanger
Sogn og Fjordane Teater
Stella Polaris, Sandefjord
Teater Ibsen, Skien
Teatret Vårt, Molde
Teaterhuset Avant Garden, Trondheim
Trøndelag Teater, Trondheim

Norway
Theatres